Even in Darkness is the only studio album by American rap supergroup the Dungeon Family. It was released on November 20, 2001 via Arista Records. Production was handled by Organized Noize and Earthtone III.

Track listing
"Presenting Dungeon Family"
Backbone
Killer Mike
"Crooked Booty"
Cee-Lo
Andre 3000
Sleepy Brown
Khujo Goodie
"Follow the Light"
Sleepy Brown
Cee-Lo
Big Gipp
Big Boi
Shuga Luv
"Trans DF Express"
Cee-Lo
Outkast (André 3000 and Big Boi)
Big Gipp
Backbone
"On & On & On"
Big Boi
Witchdoctor
Goodie Mob (Big Gipp, T-Mo, and Khujo Goodie)
"Emergency"
Big Gipp
Mello
Backbone
"Forever Pimpin' (Never Slippin')"
Cool Breeze
"6 Minutes (Dungeon Family It's On)"
Big Boi
Witchdoctor
Goodie Mob (Big Gipp, Cee-Lo, T-Mo, and Khujo Goodie)
Backbone
Cool Breeze
Big Rube
"White Gutz"
Sleepy Brown
Big Boi
Bubba Sparxxx
Goodie Mob (Big Gipp, Cee-Lo, and Khujo Goodie)
"Rollin'"
Andre 3000
Cee-Lo
Society of Soul (Sleepy Brown, Big Rube, and Roni)
"They Comin'..."
Lumberjacks (T-Mo and Khujo Goodie)
"Excalibur"
Goodie Mob (Big Gipp, Khujo Goodie, and Cee-Lo)
Big Rube
"What Iz Rap?"
Witchdoctor
Big Rube
"Curtains (DF 2nd Generation)"
ChamDon (G-Rock and C-Smooth)
Blvd. International
Slimm Calhoun
Killer Mike
Koncrete (C-Bone, Supa Nate, and Lil' Brotha)
Lil' Will

Personnel

 Aaron Mills – bass (tracks: 2, 4, 9, 10)
 André Lauren Benjamin – lead vocals (tracks: 2, 4, 10), backing vocals (track 2)
 Antwan André Patton – lead vocals (tracks: 3-6, 8, 9), additional vocals (track 5), backing vocals (track 8)
 Brandon "Shuga Luv" Bennett – lead vocals (track 3)
 Bob Lewis – trombone (track 12)
 Brian "Slimm Calhoun" Loving – lead vocals (track 14)
 Calvin Loatman – guitar (track 7)
 Cameron Gipp – lead vocals (tracks: 3-5, 8, 9, 12)
 Corey "C-Bone" Andrews – lead vocals (track 14)
 David Whild – guitar (tracks: 3, 10)
 Debra Killings – backing vocals (track 8)
 Donny Mathis – guitar (track 2, 11, 12)
 Eric Alexander – trombone (track 12)
 Erin "Witchdoctor" Johnson – lead vocals (tracks: 5, 8, 13)
 Frederick "Cool Breeze" Bell – lead vocals (tracks: 7, 8)
 Greg "G-Rocka" Martin – backing vocals (track 6)
 Jamahr "Backbone" Williams – lead vocals (tracks: 1, 4, 6, 8)
 James "Mello Capone" Hollins – lead vocals (track 6)
 Jason Freeman – horns (track 2)
 Jerry Freeman – horns (track 2)
 Joi Elaine Gilliam-Gipp – additional vocals (track 4)
 Jonathan Mannion – photography
 Kawan "KP" Prather – A&R
 Kebbi Williams – horns (track 2)
 Kirsten Shelton – backing vocals (track 7)
 Lee King – trumpet (track 12)
 Marvin "Chanz" Parkman – keyboards (tracks: 1, 2, 5, 6, 11), bass (track 7), organ (track 12)
 Michael "Blue" Williams – co-executive producer, management
 Michael Santiago Render – lead vocals (track 14), additional vocals (track 1)
 Mike Barry – trumpet (track 12)
 Mike Cebulski – timpani & gong (track 12)
 Mike Hartnett – bass (tracks: 8, 13), guitar (track 13)
 Nathaniel Elder – lead vocals (track 14)
 Nivea B. Hamilton – additional vocals (track 5)
 Patrick "Sleepy" Brown – lead vocals (tracks: 2, 3, 10), additional vocals & strings (track 4), backing vocals & keyboards (track 8)
 Richard Owens – horns (track 2)
 Robert "T-Mo" Barnett – lead vocals (tracks: 5, 8, 11)
 Ruben Lemont Bailey – lead vocals (tracks: 8, 10, 12, 13)
 Thomas DeCarlo Callaway – lead vocals (tracks: 2, 3, 8, 10, 12), additional vocals (tracks: 4, 12)
 Warren Anderson Mathis – lead vocals (track 9)
 Willie Edward Knighton – lead vocals (tracks: 2, 5, 8, 11, 12), additional vocals (track 11)
 Blvd. International – backing vocals (track 6), lead vocals (track 14)
 Brother James – lead vocals (track 14)
 Chamdon – lead vocals (track 14)
 Cutmaster Swiff – scratches (tracks: 5, 14)
 DJ Herb – scratches (track 6)
 Earthtone III – producers (tracks: 1, 2, 5, 11)
 Lil' Will – additional vocals (track 14)
 Organized Noize – producers (tracks: 3, 4, 6-10, 12-14)
 Preecha – additional vocals (track 13)
 Preston Crump – bass (tracks: 12, 14)
 Ramon – additional vocals (track 13)
 Ramon Campbell – A&R
 Ricciano – backing vocals (tracks: 6, 7, 9)
 Society Of Soul – vocals (track 10)
 Sweet Melodi – backing vocals (track 9)

Charts

Weekly charts

Year-end charts

References

External links

2001 debut albums
Dungeon Family albums
Arista Records albums
Albums produced by Organized Noize